Controversy is the fourth studio album by American recording artist Prince, released on October 14, 1981 by Warner Bros. Records. It was produced by Prince, written (with the exception of one track) by him, and he also performed most of the instruments on its recording. 

Controversy reached number three on the Billboard R&B Albums chart and was certified Platinum by the Recording Industry Association of America (RIAA). It was voted the eighth best album of the year in the 1981 Pazz & Jop, an annual critics poll run by The Village Voice.

This was the first of his albums to associate Prince with the color purple as well as the first to use sensational spelling in his song titles.

Music and lyrics 

Controversy opens with the title track, which raises questions that were being asked about Prince at the time, including his race and sexuality. The song "flirts with blasphemy" by including a chant of The Lord's Prayer. "Do Me, Baby" is an "extended bump-n-grind" ballad with explicitly sexual lyrics, and "Ronnie, Talk to Russia" is a politically charged plea to President Ronald Reagan. "Private Joy" is a bouncy bubblegum pop-funk tune, "showing off Prince's lighter side", followed by "Annie Christian", which lists historical events such as the murder of African-American children in Atlanta and the death of John Lennon. The album's final song, "Jack U Off", is a synthesized rockabilly-style track.

Critical reception 

In a contemporary review for Rolling Stone magazine, music critic Stephen Holden wrote that "Prince's first three records were so erotically self-absorbed that they suggested the reveries of a licentious young libertine. On Controversy, that libertine proclaims unfettered sexuality as the fundamental condition of a new, more loving society than the bellicose, overtechnologized America of Ronald Reagan." He went on to say, "Despite all the contradictions and hyperbole in Prince's playboy philosophy, I still find his message refreshingly relevant."

Robert Christgau was less enthusiastic in a generally favorable review for The Village Voice, in which he wrote that its "socially conscious songs are catchy enough, but they spring from the mind of a rather confused young fellow, and while his politics get better when he sticks to his favorite subject, which is s-e-x, nothing here is as far-out and on-the-money as 'Head' or 'Sister' or the magnificent 'When You Were Mine.'"

According to Blender magazine's Keith Harris, Controversy is "Prince's first attempt to get you to love him for his mind, not just his body", as it "refines the propulsive funk of previous albums and adds treatises on religion, work, nuclear war and Abscam." Stephen Thomas Erlewine of AllMusic remarked that it "continues in the same vein of new wave-tinged funk on Dirty Mind, emphasizing Prince's fascination with synthesizers and synthesizing disparate pop music genres".

Controversy was voted the eighth best album of the year in the 1981 Pazz & Jop, an annual critics' poll run by The Village Voice.

Track listing
All songs written by Prince, except where noted.

Personnel 
Adapted from the AllMusic credits and Prince Vault.
 Prince – lead vocals, all other instruments, producer, arranger
 Lisa Coleman – sitar, keyboards, backing vocals on "Controversy", "Ronnie, Talk to Russia" and "Jack U Off"
 Dr. Fink – keyboards on "Jack U Off"
 Bobby Z. – drums on "Jack U Off"
 Morris Day – drums (uncredited, possible involvement) on "Controversy"
Technical
 Mic Guzauski - engineer
 Bob Mockler - engineer
 Ross Pallone - engineer
 Peggy McCreary - engineer (uncredited)
 Bernie Grundman - mastering (A&M Studios)
 Allen Beaulieu - photography
 Bob Cavallo - personal management
 Joe Ruffalo - personal management
 Steve Fargnoli - personal management

Charts

Weekly charts

Year-end charts

Charting Singles

Certifications

See also
Ronald Reagan in music

Notes

References

External links
 Controversy at Discogs

1981 albums
Prince (musician) albums
Albums produced by Prince (musician)
Warner Records albums
Albums recorded at Sunset Sound Recorders
Albums recorded in a home studio